José Antonio Prud'homme (born 30 October 1947) is a Mexican field hockey player. He competed in the men's tournament at the 1968 Summer Olympics.

References

External links
 

1947 births
Living people
Mexican male field hockey players
Olympic field hockey players of Mexico
Field hockey players at the 1968 Summer Olympics
Sportspeople from Mexico City